Yudai Nagano (永野 雄大, Nagano Yūdai, born 15 October 1998) is a Japanese foil fencer. He competed in the 2020 Summer Olympics.

References

1998 births
Living people
People from Ibaraki Prefecture
Sportspeople from Ibaraki Prefecture
Fencers at the 2020 Summer Olympics
Japanese male foil fencers
Olympic fencers of Japan
20th-century Japanese people
21st-century Japanese people